The following are basketball events that are expected to take place in 2021 throughout the world.
Tournaments include international (FIBA), professional (club), and amateur and collegiate levels.

International tournaments

National senior team tournaments

3X3 championships
 September 10 – 12: 2021 FIBA 3x3 Europe Cup in  Paris
 November 12 - 14: 2021 FIBA 3x3 AmeriCup in  Miami, Florida

Other international championships

FIBA youth championships
3-11 July: 2021 FIBA Under-19 Basketball World Cup
7-15 August: 2021 FIBA Under-19 Women's Basketball World Cup

Professional club seasons

FIBA Intercontinental Cup

Continental seasons

Men

Women

Regional seasons

Men

Women

Domestic league seasons

Men

Europe

Asia

Americas

African

Oceania

Other Country

Women

Europe

Asia

Americas

African

Oceania

Other Country

College seasons

Men's

Women's

Deaths 
January 2 — Paul Westphal, 70, Hall of Fame American NBA player (Phoenix Suns, Boston Celtics) and NBA (Phoenix Suns, Seattle SuperSonics, Sacramento Kings) and college coach (Grand Canyon, Pepperdine).
January 5 — András Haán, 74, Hungarian Olympic player (1964).
January 7 — Grant Gondrezick, 57, American NBA player (Phoenix Suns, Los Angeles Clippers).
January 10 — Wayne Radford, 64, American NBA player (Indiana Pacers) and NCAA champion at Indiana (1976).
January 10 — Dee Rowe, 91, American college coach (UConn).
January 13 — Borivoje Cenić, 90, Serbian player (Radnički Belgrade) and coach (OKK Beograd, Apollon Patras).
January 18 — Tony Ingle, 68, American college coach (BYU, Kennesaw State, Dalton State).
January 19 — Lou Goetz, 74, American college coach (Richmond).
January 19 — Bob Williams, 89, American NBA player (Minneapolis Lakers).
January 22 — Gianfranco Lombardi, 79, Italian player (Virtus Bologna) and coach (Scaligera Verona). Three-time Olympian (1960, 1964, 1968).
January 23 — Wayne Stevens, 84, American NBA player (Cincinnati Royals).
January 23 — Harthorne Wingo, 73, American NBA player (New York Knicks).
January 24 — Jerry Johnson, 102, American college coach (LeMoyne–Owen).
January 26 — Sekou Smith, 48, American sportswriter who covered the NBA.
January 29 — John Chaney, 89, Hall of Fame American college coach (Cheyney, Temple).
February 7 — Lew Hill, 55, American college coach (Texas–Rio Grande Valley)
February 8 — Phil Rollins, 87, American NBA player (Philadelphia Warriors, Cincinnati Royals, St. Louis Hawks, New York Knicks).
February 10 — Dick Bunt, 91, American NBA player (New York Knicks, Baltimore Bullets).
February 13 — Ansley Truitt, 70, American ABA player (Dallas Chaparrals).
March 10 — Joe Tait, 83, American NBA announcer (Cleveland Cavaliers).
March 12 — Miodrag Baletić, 72, Montenegrin coach (KK Budućnost, KK MZT Skopje).
March 12 — Dwight Waller, 75, American NBA (Atlanta Hawks) and ABA (Denver Rockets) player.
March 13 — Bob Davis, 93, American college coach (High Point, Georgetown (KY), Auburn).
March 20 — Jack Phelan, 95, American NBA player (Waterloo Hawks, Sheboygan Red Skins).
March 22 — Elgin Baylor, 86, American Hall of Fame NBA player (Los Angeles Lakers) and executive (Los Angeles Clippers).
March 23 — Benny Dees, 86, American college coach (VCU, New Orleans, Wyoming, Western Carolina).
March 23 — Joe Vancisin, 98, American college coach (Yale).
March 23 — Granville Waiters, 60, American NBA player (Indiana Pacers, Houston Rockets, Chicago Bulls).
March 25 — Stan Albeck, 89, American NBA (Cleveland Cavaliers, San Antonio Spurs, New Jersey Nets, Chicago Bulls) and college (Bradley) coach.
March 31 — Ron Greene, 82, American college coach (New Orleans, Mississippi State, Murray State, Indiana State).
April 3 — Ho Lien Siew, 88, Singaporean Olympic player (1956).
April 10 — Vito Fabris, 66, Italian player (Fulgor Libertas Forlì, Pallacanestro Firenze, Basket Mestre, Olimpia Pistoia).
April 11 — Miguel López Abril, 66, Spanish player (FC Barcelona Bàsquet, Bàsquet Manresa, Baloncesto Málaga).
April 13 — Bruce Larson, American college coach (Arizona).
April 13 — Bobby Leonard, 88, American NBA player (Los Angeles Lakers, Chicago Packers) and Hall of Fame ABA coach (Indiana Pacers).
April 13 — Ruth Roberta de Souza, 52, Brazilian Olympic player (1992).
April 14 — Frank Card, 76, American ABA player (Minnesota Pipers, Virginia Squires, Carolina Cougars, Denver Rockets).
April 15 — Bill Thieben, 86, American NBA player (Detroit Pistons).
April 16 — Nelson Haggerty, 47, American college coach (Midwestern State)
April 18 — Frank McCabe, 93, American Olympic gold medalist (1952).
April 19 — Shaler Halimon, 76, American NBA and ABA player (Philadelphia 76ers, Chicago Bulls, Portland Trail Blazers, Atlanta Hawks, Dallas Chaparrals).
April 22 — Terrence Clarke, 19, American college player (Kentucky)
May 3 — Steve McKean, 77, New Zealand coach.
May 3 — Masatomo Taniguchi, 75, Japanese Olympic player (1972).
May 4 — Jim Hagan, 83, American college All-American (Tennessee Tech) and AAU player (Phillips 66ers).
May 8 — Cal Luther, 93, American college coach (DePauw, Murray State, Longwood, UT Martin, Bethel).
May 10 — Miguel Arellano, 80, Mexican Olympic player (1964, 1968).
May 14 — Bob Jones, 81, American college coach (Kentucky Wesleyan).
May 20 — Jean Bayle-Lespitau, 92, French administrator (Ligue nationale de basket).
May 26 — Spas Natov, 53, Bulgarian player (BC Cherno More).
May 28 — Mark Eaton, 64, American NBA player (Utah Jazz).
May 30 — Ralph Davis, 82, American NBA player (Cincinnati Royals, Chicago Packers).
June 2 — Eric Mobley, 51, American NBA player (Milwaukee Bucks, Vancouver Grizzlies).
June 15 — Jim Phelan, 92, American NBA player (Philadelphia Warriors) and college coach (Mount Saint Mary's).
July 7 — Eddie Payne, 69, American college coach (Belmont Abbey, East Carolina, Oregon State, Greensboro, USC Upstate).
July 21 — Stan McKenzie, 76, American NBA player (Baltimore Bullets, Phoenix Suns, Portland Trail Blazers, Houston Rockets).
July 26 — Cliff Anderson, 76, American NBA player (Los Angeles Lakers, Denver Rockets, Cleveland Cavaliers, Philadelphia 76ers).
August 3 – Tommy Curtis, 69, American college player (UCLA Bruins)
August 24 – Jerry Harkness, 81, American NBA player (New York Knicks, Indiana Pacers), college national champion at Loyola Chicago (1963).
August 26 — Rafael Hechanova, 93, Filipino Olympic player (1952).
September 6 – Dick Parfitt, 90, American college coach (Central Michigan).
September 6 – Frank Russell, 72, American NBA player (Chicago Bulls).
September 9 — Gene Littles, 78, American college (North Carolina A&T) and NBA (Charlotte Hornets) coach.
September 16 – Dušan Ivković, 77, Serbian coach (Partizan, Olympiacos, CSKA Moscow), FIBA Hall of Famer (2017), EuroLeague Basketball Legend (2017)
September 18 — Neil McCarthy, 82, American college coach (Weber State, New Mexico State).
October 2 — Major Wingate, 37, American player.
October 5 — Jerry Shipp, 86, American player (Phillips 66ers), Olympic gold medalist (1964)
October 12 — Leon Black, American college coach (Lon Morris, Texas).
October 27 — Bob Ferry, 84, American NBA player (St. Louis Hawks, Detroit Pistons, Baltimore Bullets) and executive (Washington Bullets).
October 30 — Lafayette Stribling, 87, American college coach (Mississippi Valley State, Tougaloo).
November 7 — Ronnie Williams, 59, American college player (Florida).
November 8 — Medina Dixon, 59, American college player (Old Dominion) and Olympic bronze medalist (1992).
November 12 — Davíð Janis, 75,  Icelandic and Indonesian basketball player and one of the first foreign basketball players to play in Iceland.
November 19 — Don Kojis, 82, American NBA player.
November 25 — Risto Kala, 80, Finnish Olympic player (1964).
December 5 — Stevan Jelovac, 32, Serbian player (Mega Vizura, CAI Zaragoza, AEK B.C.).
December 11 — Ed Gayda, 94, American NBA player (Tri-Cities Blackhawks).
December 30 — Sam Jones, 88, American NBA player (Boston Celtics). 10-time NBA champion.
December 31 — Christine Grant, 85, American college athletics administrator (Iowa), member of the Women's Basketball Hall of Fame.

References

 
2021 sport-related lists